= Persada Era Agro Kencana =

Company of Indonesia

PT Persada Era Agro Kencana is a palm oil company from Indonesia. It has set fires that spread into PT RMU Ecosystem Restoration Area. According to Rainforest Rescue, the government of Indonesia permits PT PEAK, a palm oil company, to destroy a peat dome currently under restoration.
